The Benham House is a historic house located at 280-282 South Main Street in Canandaigua, Ontario County, New York.

Description and history 
It was built in about 1876, and is a two-story, three-bay wide, Italianate-style brick dwelling. It features a low hipped roof topped by a cupola with cast iron cresting, full-width front porch, and two-story projecting bay window.

It was listed on the National Register of Historic Places on April 26, 1984.

References

Houses on the National Register of Historic Places in New York (state)
Italianate architecture in New York (state)
Houses completed in 1876
Houses in Ontario County, New York
National Register of Historic Places in Ontario County, New York